Yulin is a town under the administration of Ji'an, Jilin, China. , it has one residential community and nine villages under its administration.

References 

Township-level divisions of Jilin
Ji'an, Jilin